Mutuelle de Santé is a community-based health insurance scheme run by the Rwandan government.

In March 2020 it signed a 10-year contract with Babylon Health to roll out their mobile phone based Babyl service over the next ten years. This is intended to establish a universal primary care service. 30% of the adult population is already registered with the service.

References

Medical and health organisations based in Rwanda